Lincoln Hospital may refer to:

 Lincoln Hospital (Casa Grande, Arizona), listed on the NRHP in Pinal County, Arizona
Lincoln Hospital (Bronx, New York)
Lincoln Hospital (Durham, North Carolina) 1901–1976
Lincoln Community Health Center, Durham, North Carolina, an outpatient primary care facility
Lincoln County Hospital, Lincoln, England